Robert R. Bryant (June 14, 1918 – November 3, 2000) was an American football tackle who played four seasons with the San Francisco 49ers of the All-America Football Conference.  He played college football at Texas Tech University and attended Olton High School in Olton, Texas. He was also a member of the Calgary Stampeders of the Western Interprovincial Football Union.

References

External links
Just Sports Stats
CFLapedia
Fanbase profile

1918 births
2000 deaths
Players of American football from Oklahoma
American football tackles
Canadian football tackles
American players of Canadian football
Texas Tech Red Raiders football players
San Francisco 49ers players
Calgary Stampeders players
People from Frederick, Oklahoma